Ki-67 may refer to:

 Mitsubishi Ki-67, a Japanese bomber used during World War II
 Ki-67 (protein), Proliferation marker